The Warren J. Harang Jr. Municipal Auditorium is a 3,500-seat multi-purpose arena in Thibodaux, Louisiana. It was built in 1970 and is named in honor of Warren J. Harang Jr., the long-time mayor of Thibodaux. The facility includes a main arena and a meeting room.

Usage
The arena is used to host basketball and volleyball games, professional wrestling and roller derby. The Cajun Rollergirls of the WFTDA use the arena for their home competitions.

Concerts, conventions, comedy shows and graduations are also held in the arena.

See also
 List of convention centers in the United States
 List of music venues

References

External links
 Official Website

Basketball venues in Louisiana
Convention centers in Louisiana
Indoor arenas in Louisiana
Music venues in Louisiana
Sports venues in Thibodaux, Louisiana
Sports venues in Louisiana
Volleyball venues in Louisiana
Buildings and structures in Lafourche Parish, Louisiana
Sports venues completed in 1970
1970 establishments in Louisiana